Eva Maria Meineke (8 October 1923 - 7 May 2018) was a German actress. She appeared in more than one hundred films from 1942 to 2008, including Yesterday Girl and Something for Everyone.

Selected filmography

References

External links 

1923 births
2018 deaths
German film actresses
German television actresses
20th-century German actresses
21st-century German actresses
Officers Crosses of the Order of Merit of the Federal Republic of Germany